Francesco Gentileschi was a 17th-century Italian painter of the Baroque period. He was son of Orazio Gentileschi, but upon the death of his father, he entered the studio of the Genoese painter Domenico Fiasella. He died young.

Sources

External links
Orazio and Artemisia Gentileschi, a fully digitized exhibition catalog from The Metropolitan Museum of Art Libraries, which contains material on Francesco Gentileschi (see index)

17th-century Italian painters
Italian male painters
Painters from Genoa
Italian Baroque painters